The Serbs in Hungary (/ ) are recognized as an ethnic minority, numbering 7,210 people or 0.1% of the total population (2011 census). The number of Serbs in Hungary has drastically diminished; in the 16th, 17th and 18th centuries large Serb communities existed throughout Hungary, notably in Buda (western Budapest), Baja, Szentendre and Szeged. The Serb community in the territory of present-day Hungary has its origin in migrations from the territory of medieval Serbian states during and after the Ottoman conquest of these states. Matthias Corvinus and his successors are known to have welcomed Serbs from the other side of the Danube, giving the exiled military commanders fiefdoms to rule and defend from the Ottomans. After the dissolution of Austro-Hungarian monarchy in 1918 and after new borders were defined by the Treaty of Trianon in 1920, only a small fraction of ethnic Serbs remained within the borders of post-Trianon Hungary.

History
The presence of Serbs in the territory of present-day Hungary date from the Middle Ages. The mother of the Hungarian king Géza II (1141-1162) was Helena of Serbia, a daughter of Uroš I, ruler of the Grand Principality of Serbia. During the rule of Géza II, her brother Beloš Vukanović was a palatine of the Kingdom of Hungary. When the Magyars arrived to the Pannonian Basin under Arpad in 896, they met there with the already well established Slavic population. This Slavic population however was quickly assimilated or otherwise exterminated. The Serbs who later migrated into the Pannonian Basin from the Balkans, were the descendants of  those Slavs who in the 7th century migrated from the Pannonian Basin southwards into the Balkan peninsula. 

Since the 14th century, escaping from the Ottoman threat, a large number of Serbs migrated to the Kingdom of Hungary where many of them served as soldiers. After the Battle of Mohács in 1526, much of the territory of present-day Hungary came under Ottoman administration. During Ottoman administration towns in the territory of present-day Hungary began decaying and the former Hungarian and German population left them. In that time, especially in the 17th century, many Serb, and other South Slavic migrants settled in the territory of present-day Hungary. It is interesting that most of the Ottoman soldiers in the territory of present-day Hungary were South Slavs (mostly Serbs and Bosnian muslims).

After territory of present-day Hungary came under Habsburg administration, a new wave of Serb refugees migrated to the area in 1690, as a consequence of the Habsburg-Ottoman war. In the first half of the 18th century, Serbs and South Slavs were ethnic majority in several cities in the territory of present-day Hungary, including Buda, Szentendre, Baja, Pécs, Szeged, etc. After the devastating Ottoman wars these cities had a very low population.

In 1698, more than a half of population of Pécs were South Slavs (including Serbs). In 1715, the population of Buda numbered 1,539 houses, of which 769 were South Slavic (mostly Serb), 701 German, and 68 Hungarian. In 1715, the population of Baja numbered 237 houses, of which 216 were South Slavic (Serb and Bunjevac), 16 Hungarian, and 5 German. In 1720, 88% of population of Szentendre were South Slavs (mostly Serbs). In 1720, the population of Szeged numbered 193 houses, of which 99 were Serb.

During the 18th and 19th century, the Hungarian-Serb ethnic border moved southward and fixed in the territory of present-day Vojvodina. Following the dissolution of Austro-Hungarian Monarchy in 1918, the Serbian army and South Slavic People's Administration from Novi Sad controlled not only present-day Vojvodina, but also southern parts of present-day Hungary.

The Treaty of Trianon from 1920 defined the border between Hungary and the Kingdom of Serbs, Croats and Slovenes and assigned most of Baranya and the northern part of Bácska (around city of Baja) to Hungary. As a response to this, a short-lived Serb-Hungarian Baranya-Baja Republic was formed in this area in 1921. The president of the republic was Serb, Petar Dobrović.

After the Serb-Croat-Slovene army evacuated the territory of the Baranya-Baja Republic the two countries signed a citizenship treaty. According to that treaty, members of the Serb minority in Hungary gained right to opt for citizenship of the Kingdom of Serbs, Croats and Slovenes. About two-thirds of the Serbs (called optants) left Hungary in the following decade. Almost the whole Serb population of Sárok, Deszk, Újszentiván, Szőreg, Majs and Dunaszekcső became optants.

In 1910, 26,248 people in the territory of present-day Hungary spoke Serbian. In 1920, number of Serbian speakers was 17,132, in 1930 7,031, in 1941 5,442, in 1970 11,177, in 1980 3,426, in 1990 2,953, 2001 3,388  and in 2011 3,708(compared with 7,210 declared Serbs in the same year).

Geography

Small Serb communities are scattered in the southern part of the country. There are also some Serbs who live in the central part of the country - in bigger towns like Budapest, Szentendre, etc. The only settlement with an ethnic Serb majority in Hungary is Lórév (Serbian: Lovra / Ловра) on Csepel Island. This small village of 307 people had 180 Serb inhabitants (and 202 people with a Serb "cultural heritage"). But there are other small Serb settlements in the town of Ráckeve and the village of Szigetcsép, also on Csepel Island. Not far to the north the Bunjevci settlement of Tököl is to be found. A tradition of mutual weddings between Lórév and Tököl existed as well as strong connections with Serbs from the villages of Medina in the south, three villages north of Budapest -- Budakalasz, Pomáz and Csobánka. We also find Serbs and Bunjevci living together in other Hungarian towns, Baja, Gara and Katymár, and in the following villages, Csávoly, Felsőszentiván, Bácsalmás, Csikéria, Bácsbokod, Mátételke and Vaskút.

Heritage

Serbs left a valuable architectural heritage in Hungary. The number of Serbian Orthodox churches is higher than we should expect by the small number of present-day Serb population. These Baroque churches were mostly built in the 18-19th centuries when Serb merchants formed rich and influential communities in Hungarian towns. Village churches show the historical presence of Serbs in places from where they absolutely disappeared by now.

Towns, cultural institutions, churches and monasteries:

 The most complex example of Serb architectural heritage in Hungary is the old town of Szentendre (Serbian: Sentandreja), next to the Danube, with 7 Orthodox Churches (two of which have been sold), brightly coloured merchant houses and the Museum of Serbian Orthodox Heritage.
 In Budapest, the Serbian Orthodox Cathedral in the Tabán district was damaged in WWII and later demolished. There is an old Serbian Orthodox Church in Serb Street, Pest and the famous Serb college, Thökölyanum (Serbian: Tekelijanum).
 Churches in Vác (Vac), Székesfehérvár (Stoni Beograd) with a Serbian open-air village museum, Szeged (Segedin), Baja (Baja) with two churches, Mohács (Mohač), Siklós (Šikloš), Eger (Jegra), Győr (Đur), Esztergom (Ostrogon), Hódmezővásárhely (Vašarhelj), Adony (Džuntaran, demolished after World War II).
Village churches in Pomáz (Pomaz), Csobánka (Čobanac), Izbég, Ráckeve (Srpski Kovin, rare example of Serb Gothic architecture from the 15th century), Lórév (Lovra), Szigetcsép (Čip), Budakalász (Kalaz), Magyarcsanád (Čanad), Battonya (Batanja), Deszk (Deska), Szőreg (Sirig), Dunapentele (Pantelija, now Dunaújváros), Százhalombatta (Bata), Dunaföldvár (Feldvar), Alsónána (Donja Nana), Bátaszék (Batsek, demolished in the 1960s), Medina (Medina), Illocska (Iločac), Magyarbóly (Madžarboja), Dunaszekcső (Sečuj), Villány (Viljan), Sárok (Šarok), Majs (Majš), Lippó (Lipova), Beremend (Breme), Erdősmecske (Racmečka), Somberek (Šumberak), Véménd (Vemend, demolished in 1964), Nagybudmér (Veliki Budmir, demolished in 2001), Hercegszántó (Santovo), Újszentiván (Novi Sentivan), Pécsvárad (Pečvar, demolished in 1925), Liptód (Litoba, demolished in 1951).
The Serbian Orthodox Monastery of Grábóc (Grabovac).

Notable people	
	

Notable Serbs and notable persons of Serb descent from the territory of present-day Hungary include:

Helena (ca. 1109–1146), Queen consort of Hungary.
Jovan Avakumović (1748–1810), poet. Born in Szentendre.
Miloš Crnjanski (1893–1977), Serbian poet, author, and a diplomat. Born in Csongrád.
János Damjanich (born Jovan Damjanić)  (1804–1849), a general of the Hungarian army in 1848/1849 revolution. Damjanić is a controversial historical figure; being an ethnic Serb, he led the army that fought against his own people during the revolution. After the collapse of the Hungarian revolution in 1849, he was sentenced to death and executed together with twelve other Hungarian generals. Therefore, the Hungarians consider Damjanić a national hero, while the Serbs gave him a nickname љута гуја, српска издајица (ljuta guja, srpskа izdajica; i.e. "a venomous serpent, the traitor of the Serbs").
Petar Dobrović (1890–1942), a painter, politician, and president of the short lived Baranya-Baja Republic.
Soma Orlai Petrich (1822–1880), Hungarian painter whose father was Serbian.
Konstantin Danil, a well-known painter of Serbo-Russian roots.
Jakov Ignjatović (1822–1899), Serb novelist and prose writer. Born in Szentendre.
Radovan Jelašić (born in 1968 in Baja), a governor of the National Bank of Serbia.
Vikentije Jovanović (1698–1737),  Serbian Orthodox Metropolitan of Karlovci from 1732 to 1737
Jovan Pačić (1771–1849), poet and officer. He was born in Baja.
Sándor Petőfi (Aleksandar Petrović) (1823–1849), a Hungarian national poet of mixed Serb and Slovak descent.
Zorán Sztevanovity (Zoran Stevanović) (born in 1942), singer, guitar player.
Döme Sztójay (Dimitrije Stojaković) (1883–1946), a Hungarian soldier and diplomat of Serbian origin, who served as Prime Minister of Hungary during World War II.
Sava Tekelija (1761–1842), the first Serb doctor of law, president of the Matica srpska, philanthropist, noble, and merchant.
Mihály Vitkovics (Mihailo Vitković) (1778–1829), Hungarian and Serb poet.
Sebo Vukovics (Sava Vuković) (1811–1872), a Hungarian politician of Serb descent, who served as Minister of Justice in 1849 during the Hungarian Revolution.
Emil Uzelac, one of the earlier aviators.
Béni Kállay, a Hungarian statesman of Serbian roots.
Gavrilo Rodić, one of the highest ranking generals in the Austro-Hungarian Armed Forces in the 19th century.
Jeronim Ljubibratić in 1730 joined the regiment of Grenzer.
Dragomir Dujmov, A Serbian poet, born in Hungary.
Rajko Tomović, Serbian scientist, born in Hungary.
Milo Dor, Austrian writer of Serbian origin, born in Hungary.
Sportspeople:
Momčilo Tapavica (1872–1949), Hungarian tennis player, weightlifter and wrestler
Nataša Janić, Hungarian canoer, Serbian-born
Bojana Radulović, Hungarian handball player, Serbian-born
Nenad Puljezević, Hungarian handball player, Serbian-born
Nikola Eklemović, Hungarian handball player, Serbian-born
Milorad Krivokapić, Hungarian handball player, Serbian-born
Uroš Vilovski, Hungarian handball player, Serbian-born
Tijana Krivačević, Hungarian basketball player, Serbian-born
Predrag Bošnjak, Hungarian football player, Serbian-born
Nemanja Nikolić, Hungarian football player, Serbian-born
Serb noble families:
Jakšić noble family
Bakić noble family

See also 

 Rascians
 Serbian communities in Hungary
 History of the Serbs
 Serbs of Vojvodina
 Metropolitanate of Karlovci
 Declaratory Rescript of the Illyrian Nation 
 Serbian Kindergarten, Primary School, High School and Students' Home
 Rác (surname)

References

Sources

 
 
 
 
 
 
 
 
 
 
 
 
 
 
 
 
 
 

 
Serbian Orthodox Church in Hungary
Hungary
Serb communities in Hungary
Ethnic groups in Hungary
Hungary
Hungary
Hungary
Hungary